Xiaoliang is a masculine given name of Chinese origin that may refer to:

Bi Xiaoliang (born 1992), Chinese high jumper
Liu Xiaoliang, Chinese speed skater and medalist at the 2007 Asian Winter Games
Xiaoliang Sunney Xie (born 1962), Chinese chemistry professor
Xu Xiaoliang (born 1962), Chinese Olympic basketball player

Chinese masculine given names